The first High Sheriff of Denbighshire was John Salusbury, snr, appointed in 1540.  The shrievalty of Denbighshire, together with that of Flintshire, continued until 1974 when it was abolished after the county and shrievalty of Clwyd was created.

The role High Sheriff in each county is the oldest secular office under the Crown.  The High Sheriff changed every March. Formerly the High Sheriff was the principal law enforcement officer in the county but over the centuries most of the responsibilities associated with the post have been transferred elsewhere or are now defunct, so that its functions are now largely ceremonial.

List of High Sheriffs

16th century

17th century

18th century

19th century

20th century

References

 
Denbighshire
Denbighshire